Khyber Mail is a passenger train operated daily by Pakistan Railways between Karachi and Peshawar. The train named after the famous Khyber Pass, located in the province of Khyber Pakhtunkhwa. The Khyber Mail is one of Pakistan's oldest and most prestigious passenger trains that has been continuously running since 12 February 1920. The Train has completed its 100 years of Service on February 12, 2020. The Train departs Karachi Cantonment at 22.00 hrs every night, Lahore Junction arrival next night 19.45 hrs & departure 20.20 hrs. The train reaches Peshawar Cantonment at 06.00 hrs on 3rd morning. Return timings is also same in Peshawar Cantonment to Karachi Cantonment journey. The train departs Peshawar Cantonment at 22.00 hrs, Lahore Junction arrival next morning 07.40 hrs & departure 08.15hrs. The train reaches Karachi Cantonment at 06.00 hrs on 3rd morning.

Route
 Karachi Cantonment–Peshawar Cantonment via Karachi–Peshawar Railway Line

Station stops

Equipment
The train has AC Business, AC Sleeper and Economy accommodations.

References

External links
 Pakistan Railway Train Timings

Named passenger trains of Pakistan
Passenger trains in Pakistan